Joseph Peacock  (1821 – 17 January 1893) was a British architect.

He became an Associate of the Royal Institute of British Architects (ARIBA) on 13 May 1850 and a Fellow of the  Institute (FRIBA) on 19 December 1859. From the late 1850s, he was an "extremely individual" church architect. In 1868 his offices were at 15 Bloomsbury Square, London.

Notable buildings
 St Simon Zelotes, Chelsea, London (1858–59)
 St Stephen's, Gloucester Road, London (1866–67)
 St James' Church, Malcolm Street, Derby (1867)
 St Thomas' Church, Derby (1881)
 St Benet and All Saints Church, Kentish Town, London (1884–5; replaced 1928)
 Holy Cross Church, St Pancras, London (1887–88)

References

1821 births
1893 deaths
19th-century English architects
Associates of the Royal Institute of British Architects
Fellows of the Royal Institute of British Architects
Architects from London